Fair Warning is a 1937 American mystery film written and directed by Norman Foster. The film stars J. Edward Bromberg, Betty Furness, John Payne, Victor Kilian, Bill Burrud and Gavin Muir. The film was released on March 5, 1937, by 20th Century Fox.

Plot
In California's Death Valley a chemistry whiz-kid helps a sheriff track the man who murdered a wealthy mine owner who had been staying at a fancy winter resort.

Cast   
J. Edward Bromberg as Matthew Jericho
Betty Furness as Kay Farnham
John Payne as Jim Preston
Victor Kilian as Sam
Bill Burrud as Malcolm Berkhardt 
Gavin Muir as Herbert Willett
Gloria Roy as Grace Hamilton
Andrew Tombes as J.C. Farnham
Ivan Lebedeff as Count Andre Lukacha
John Eldredge as Dr. Galt
Julius Tannen as Mr. Taylor
Paul McVey as Mr. Berkhardt
Lelah Tyler as Mrs. Berkhardt
Lydia Knott as Miss Willoughby

References

External links 
 

1937 films
20th Century Fox films
American mystery films
1937 mystery films
Films directed by Norman Foster
American black-and-white films
1930s English-language films
1930s American films